Vesterbro is one of the 15 administrative, statistical, and city tax districts (bydele) comprising the municipality of Copenhagen, Denmark.

Neighboring city districts are:
 to the northeast, the Indre By, also known as "Copenhagen Center", "Downtown Copenhagen" or "City".
 to the north, Frederiksberg municipality, which is not a part of Copenhagen municipality but rather an enclave surrounded by the municipality.
 to the west, Valby.
 to the south, Kongens Enghave.

The Vesterbro district 

Vesterbro is located just outside Copenhagen’s city center—the Inner City or Indre By—making it a very attractive place to live, as are the other areas immediately outside the center: the Indre Nørrebro ("Inner Nørrebro"), Indre Østerbro ("Inner Østerbro"), Frederiksberg, and Christianshavn.

The district is located west of the city center at the location of the old Western Gate ("Vesterport"), access way into the old city. The gate, along with the other three gates into the old city—Østerport ("Eastern Gate") near the current Østerport station), Nørreport ("Northern Gate") near the current Nørreport station, and Amagerport ("Amager Gate", i.e. functionally the Southern Gate) between Christianshavn and the island of Amager—were dismantled in 1856.

The name "Vesterbro" literally translates into English as "Western Bridge", and refers to the paved (Danish, brolagt) road leading into the city through the Western Gate. Vesterbro is the area of the bridge into the city of Copenhagen, which was a much smaller city at the time when the name was created. At that time, the city was ringed by a moat which exist today as the small lakes found in Tivoli, Ørsted Park, Copenhagen Botanical Garden, and Østre Anlæg Park.

The area has been under renovation to a great extent which ended in 2017. The environment and sustainability is one of the essential reasons for the renovation.  Vesterbro has a central location that makes it a favored place to live. It has had a reputation as a center for prostitution and drug trafficking, where only the poorest would live, and there is still a certain amount of these activities in the area, especially on Istedgade and near Halmtorvet, but there has been police focus on clearing up troublesome areas. The area is also known as the easy place to get drugs in Copenhagen.

History 
Vesterbro was originally the name of the paved country road that led into the city center from the west. Few country roads in those days were paved, but the amount of traffic into the capital necessitated it.

Until 1853 after the cholera epidemic that had hit Copenhagen, there had been a "no build" zone outside Copenhagen’s old part of town, the part now known as the Inner City or Indre By. This demarcation line (Demarkationslinien) indicated an area beyond the city’s centuries old defence wall system where Copenhagen’s defence forces could strike the enemy unhindered.

Until then there was little development outside the center of the city, except with special permission. Even though much of the area was used as grazing land, by the 1780s there were approximately 1,000 inhabitants of the area, as well as a number of commercial enterprises (lumberyards, tobacco farm, several industrial buildings), and the house of the Royal Copenhagen Shooting Society and Danish Brotherhood ("Det kongelige kjøbenhavnske Skydeselskab og danske Broderskab"). The society received permission to build outside the old city limits in the 1750s, and the building had housed the Copenhagen City Museum starting in 1956. It currently houses Musikhuset København, an acoustical music performance venue and culture center.

With the abolishment of the demarcation line in 1853, the dismantling of the old fortifications that ringed the center of town in the late 1860s, and the removal of the old entrance gates to the city in 1856, the population quickly spread out to the undeveloped areas outside the center. This movement came first to the inner ring of areas outside the center: the Indre Østerbro ("Inner Østerbro"), the Indre Nørrebro ("Inner Nørrebro"), Vesterbro, and Frederiksberg.

At that time the name Vesterbro began being used for the entire area around the street named Vesterbro, and late in the 1800s the name of the street itself was changed to Vesterbrogade ("Vesterbro Street").

Notable people 
 Adam Oehlenschläger (1779 in Vesterbro – 1850) a Danish poet and playwright.

Attractions 
 Istedgade (heart and soul of Vesterbro nightlife)
 Carlsberg neighbourhood
 Copenhagen Puppet Festival
 Det Ny Teater
 Ny Carlsberg Glyptotek
 Tivoli Gardens
 Tycho Brahe Planetarium
 Museum of Copenhagen
 Copenhagen Meatpacking District
 Radisson SAS Royal Hotel, Copenhagen
 Sorte Hest

Parks
 Enghaveparken
 Skydebanehaven

References

External links 

 City of Copenhagen’s statistical office
 
 Spurce (jistory)
 Source
 Source

 
Copenhagen city districts